The 1962 Tour de France was the 49th edition of the Tour de France, one of cycling's Grand Tours. The three-week  race of 22 stages, including two split stages, started in Nancy on 24 June and finished at the Parc des Princes in Paris on 15 July.

From 1930 to 1961, the Tour de France was contested by national teams, but in 1962 commercially sponsored international trade teams returned. From the late-1950s to 1962, the Tour had seen the absence of top riders who had bowed to pressure from their teams' extra-sportif (non-cycling industry) sponsors to ride other races that better suited their brands. This, and a demand for wider advertising from a declining bicycle industry, led to the reintroduction of the trade team format. In early February 1962, 22 teams submitted applications for the race, with the final list of 15 announced at the end of the month. The Spanish-based  was the first choice reserve team.

Each of the 15 teams consisted of 10 cyclists (150 total), an increase from the 1961 Tour, which had 11 teams of 12 cyclists (132 total). Each team was required to have a dominant nationality; at least six cyclists should have the same nationality, or only two nationalities should be present. For the first time, French cyclists were outnumbered; the largest number of riders from a nation came from Italy (52), with the next largest coming from France (50) and Belgium (28). Riders represented a further six nations, all European. Of the start list of 150, 66 were riding the Tour de France for the first time. The total number of riders that finished the race was 94, a record high to that point. The average age of riders in the race was 27.5 years, ranging from the 21-year-old Tiziano Galvanin to the 40-year-old Pino Cerami. The  cyclists had the youngest average age while  cyclists had the oldest. The presentation of the teams – where the members of each team's roster are introduced in front of the media and local dignitaries – took place outside the Place de la Carrière in Nancy before the start of the opening stage held in the city.

The race lead was taken by Altig's teammate Albertus Geldermans after stage six. He held it for two stages, before Darrigade took it back for the next two.  rider Willy Schroeders then led the race from the end of stage nine to the end of eleven, at which point Schroeder's teammate Rik Van Looy, a major pre-race favourite, abandoned the race with an injury. The following day, British rider Tom Simpson of Gitane–Leroux became the first from outside mainland Europe to wear the yellow jersey. He lost it after stage thirteen's individual time trial in the Pyrenees to Flandria's Jef Planckaert, who then held it for seven stages, which included the Alps. Jacques Anquetil of Saint-Raphaël won the individual time trial of stage twenty to put himself into the yellow jersey, which he held until the conclusion of the race; he defended his title, winning his third Tour de France. Planckaert finished second in the general classification, 4 min and 59 s in arrears, with  rider Raymond Poulidor third, over ten minutes behind Anquetil. Altig won the points classification and Margnat's Federico Bahamontes won the mountains classification. Saint-Raphaël won the team classification. Altig and 's Emile Daems won the most stages, with three each.

Teams

Majority of French cyclists

  (riders)
  (riders)
  (riders)
  (riders)
  (riders)
  (riders)
  (riders)

Majority of Italian cyclists

  (riders)
  (riders)
  (riders)
  (riders)
  (riders)
  (riders)

Majority of Belgian cyclists

  (riders)
  (riders)

Cyclists

By starting number

By team

By nationality

Notes

References

Bibliography
 
 
 
 
 
 
 
 
 

1962 Tour de France
1962